Stan Ivar (born January 11, 1943) is an American actor who is best known for his role as John Carter in Little House on the Prairie, and also known for his roles as Ben Robinson in NCIS, Daniel Scott in Days of Our Lives, Mark Johnson in Star Trek: Voyager, and as Captain Mike Davison in the cult movie Creature (1985).

Career 
He played blacksmith John Carter in Little House on the Prairie, joining the cast during the final season, and the TV movies Little House: Look Back to Yesterday, Little House: Bless All the Dear Children, and Little House: The Last Farewell.

Once Little House on the Prairie ended, Ivar asked if he could keep the set. Ivar later disassembled the house and moved it out to his home in rural LA County.

Other notable TV roles include Ben Robinson in NCIS, Daniel Scott in Days of Our Lives, Paul Raines in Highway to Heaven, and Mark Johnson in Star Trek: Voyager.

He has also had roles in numerous other major television series, including Grapevine, General Hospital, Crazy Like a Fox, Scarecrow and Mrs. King, Cagney & Lacey, The Practice, St. Elsewhere, The John Larroquette Show, Married with Children, Murder, She Wrote, Beverly Hills, 90210, Beauty and the Beast, Cybill, Matlock, and Moonlighting.

He has appeared in several television movies including The Alamo: Thirteen Days to Glory (1987), Shattered Dreams (1990), The Last Halloween (1991), Torch Song (1993), The Disappearance of Nora (1993), Chance of a Lifetime (1998), and many more.

Feature film roles include Creature (1985), The Big Picture (1989), Rock-A-Doodle (1991), Aspen Extreme (1993), and playing Matt LeBlanc's character's father in Ed (1996).

Filmography

Film

Television

References

External links
 

1943 births
Living people
People from Brooklyn
Male actors from New York City
American male film actors
American male television actors
American male stage actors
American male soap opera actors
20th-century American male actors